Josef Sloup known as Štaplík (19 December 1897 - 1952) was a former Czechoslovak football goalkeeper. He played 16 games for the Czechoslovakia national football team. He represented Czechoslovakia at the 1924 Olympics. His older brother Rudolf was also a footballer.

References

1897 births
1952 deaths
Czech footballers
Czechoslovak footballers
Czechoslovakia international footballers
Czech football managers
SK Slavia Prague players
Olympic footballers of Czechoslovakia
Footballers at the 1924 Summer Olympics
Association football goalkeepers
Sportspeople from Plzeň
People from the Kingdom of Bohemia
SK Slavia Prague managers